Camillo Pavanello (20 October 1879 – 7 July 1951) was an Italian gymnast. He competed in the men's individual all-around event at the 1900 Summer Olympics.

References

External links

1879 births
1951 deaths
Italian male artistic gymnasts
Olympic gymnasts of Italy
Gymnasts at the 1900 Summer Olympics
Sportspeople from the Province of Terni
People from Terni